The Labour Party of Hong Kong was a left-wing socialist political party that existed between 1964 and 1972 which called for self-government in Hong Kong and common ownership.

The party was established by two breakaway members from the Democratic Self-Government Party of Hong Kong, Tang Hon-tsai and K. Hopkin-Jenkins, and was joined by former civil servant G. S. Kennedy-Skipton as party secretary. It claimed to be defined by close association with the policies of Britain and the Commonwealth, and to be straightforwardly socialistic, by concerning itself with workers, and promoting welfare and common ownership.

Election performance

Municipal elections

References

1964 establishments in Hong Kong
1972 disestablishments in Hong Kong
Defunct political parties in Hong Kong
Labour parties in China
Political parties disestablished in 1972
Political parties established in 1964
Socialist parties in Hong Kong
Democratic socialism in Hong Kong